The following list is a discography of production by Tyler, the Creator, an American rapper and record producer. Note: Tyler, The Creator's unreleased projects will not be included.

2007

Casey Veggies - Customized Greatly Vol. 1 
 07. "Odd"

2008

I Smell Panties - I Smell Panties EP 
 01. "Bapes"
 02. "Bapes (Freestyle)"
 03. "Bring in the Hi Hat"
 04. "Hi to Me"
 05. "Lilo Fucks Stitch"
 06. "Lisa" (featuring Casey Veggies and Left Brain)

Brandun DeShay - Volume: One! For the Money 
 07. "Odd Future Freestyle"
 15. "Orange Gum Drops"

Odd Future - The Odd Future Tape 
 01. "The Tape Intro" (performed by Tyler, The Creator)
 02. "Odd Toddlers" (performed by Tyler, The Creator and Casey Veggies)
 04. "Back for Another One" (performed by Casey Veggies and Tyler, The Creator)
 06. "Fucking Lame" (performed by Tyler, The Creator)
 08. "Bitches Brewing" (performed by Tyler, The Creator)
 11. "The Life Like" (performed by Casey Veggies)
 13. "Slow It Down" (performed Tyler, The Creator and Hodgy Beats)
 14. "Remember Me" (performed by Tyler, The Creator and Casey Veggies)
 16. "Lisa" (performed by I Smell Panties, Casey Veggies and Left Brain)
 17. "Fin" (performed by Tyler, The Creator)
 18. "Commercial" (performed by Tyler, The Creator and Casey Veggies)
 19. "Dracula" (performed by Tyler, The Creator)

2009

Brandun DeShay - Volume: Two! For the Show 
 05. "More Ovaltine Please"

Hodgy Beats - The Dena Tape
 01. "Tapetro"
 05. "Biscuits"
 07. "Customized Greatly"
 16. "April Fools"
 22. "Sorry"

Casey Veggies - Customized Greatly Vol. 2
 09. "Networking"
 17. "Finally Something Different"

Tyler, The Creator - Bastard
 01. "Bastard"
 02. "Seven"
 03. "Odd Toddlers" (featuring Casey Veggies)
 Sample credit: Cortex - "Huit Octobre 1971"
 04. "French!" (featuring Hodgy Beats)
 05. "Blow"
 06. "Pigs Fly" (featuring Domo Genesis)
 07. "Parade"
 08. "Slow It Down" (featuring Hodgy Beats)
 09. "AssMilk" (featuring Earl Sweatshirt)
 10. "VCR/Wheels"
 11. "Session" (featuring Hodgy Beats, Mike G and Brandun DeShay)
 12. "Sarah"
 13. "Jack and the Beanstalk"
 Sample credit: Jay-Z - "What More Can I Say"
 14. "Tina" (featuring Jasper Dolphin and Taco)
 15. "Inglorious"

2010

Earl Sweatshirt - Earl
 01. "Thisniggaugly"
 02. "Earl"
 03. "Couch" (featuring Tyler, The Creator)
 04. "Kill"
 05. "Wakeupfaggot"
 06. "Luper"
 08. "Moonlight" (featuring Hodgy Beats)
 09. "Pigions" (featuring Tyler, The Creator)

Mike G - Ali
 01. "OkMikeG"

Domo Genesis - Rolling Papers
 01. "First Roll"
 02. "Buzzin"
 04. "Rolling Papers" (featuring Tyler, The Creator)
 05. "Dreams" (produced with Syd tha Kyd)
 06. "Cap n Crunch"
 07. "Steam Roller" (featuring Hodgy Beats)
 08. "Kickin It"
 10. "Drunk" (featuring Mike G)
 11. "Clear Eyes"
 13. "Last Roll"

Casey Veggies - Sleeping in Class
 10. "DTA" (featuring Tyler, The Creator)

Earl Sweatshirt, Tyler, The Creator and Hodgy Beats - 
 "Fuck This Christmas"

The Jet Age of Tomorrow - Journey to the 5th Echelon
 11. "Betty's Room"

2011

Tyler, The Creator - Goblin
 01. "Goblin"
 02. "Yonkers"
 03. "Radicals"
 04. "She" (featuring Frank Ocean)
 06. "Nightmare"
 07. "Tron Cat"
 08. "Her"
 09. "Sandwitches" (featuring Hodgy Beats)
 10. "Fish"
 11. "Analog" (featuring Hodgy Beats)
 12. "Bitch Suck Dick" (featuring Jasper Dolphin and Taco)
 13. "Window" (featuring Domo Genesis, Frank Ocean, Hodgy Beats and Mike G)
 14. "Au79"
 15. "Golden"

Bonus Tracks:

 16. "Burger" (featuring Hodgy Beats)
 17. "Untitled 63"
 18. "Steak Sauce"

MellowHype - BlackenedWhite
 12. "Game" (featuring Tyler, The Creator)

Pusha T
 "Ooh" (featuring Hodgy Beats, Liva Don and Tyler, The Creator)

2012

The Internet - Purple Naked Ladies Bonus Songs EP
 02. "Live It Up"

Jack Mushroom - One Up
 02. "Brotherly Love" (featuring Skoolie 300)
 04. "Cloud High"

Odd Future - The OF Tape Vol. 2
 03. "NY (Ned Flander)" (performed by Hodgy Beats and Tyler, The Creator)
 07. "Analog 2" (performed by Tyler, The Creator, Frank Ocean and Syd)
 12. "P" (performed by Hodgy Beats and Tyler, The Creator)
 13. "White" (performed by Frank Ocean) (produced with Frank Ocean)
 15. "Sam (Is Dead)" (performed by Domo Genesis and Tyler, The Creator)
 16. "Doms" (performed by Domo Genesis)
 17. "We Got Bitches" (performed by Tyler, The Creator, Taco and Jasper Dolphin)
 18. "Oldie"

Casey Veggies - Customized Greatly Vol. 3
 10. "PNCINTLOFWGKTA" (featuring Tyler, The Creator, Domo Genesis, Hodgy Beats and Earl Sweatshirt)

Frank Ocean - Channel Orange
 12. "White" (featuring John Mayer) [produced with Frank Ocean]

MellowHype - Numbers
 11. "666" (featuring Mike G) [produced with Left Brain]

2013

Tyler, The Creator - Wolf
 01. "Wolf"
 02. "Jamba" (featuring Hodgy Beats)
 03. "Cowboy"
 04. "Awkward"
 05. "Domo23"
 06. "Answer"
 07. "Slater" (featuring Frank Ocean)
 08. "48"
 09. "Colossus"
 10. "PartyIsntOver/Campfire/Bimmer" (featuring Lætitia Sadier and Frank Ocean)
 11. "IFHY" (featuring Pharrell Williams)
 12. "Pigs"
 13. "Parking Lot" (featuring Casey Veggies and Mike G)
 14. "Rusty" (featuring Domo Genesis and Earl Sweatshirt)
 15. "Trashwang" (featuring Na'kel, Jasper, Lucas, L-Boy, Taco, Left Brain and Lee Spielman)
 16. "Treehome95" (featuring Coco O. and Erykah Badu)
 17. "Tamale"
 18. “Lone”

The Music of Grand Theft Auto V, Vol. 1: Original Music
10. "Garbage"

Mac Miller - Watching Movies with the Sound Off
 18. "O.K." (featuring Tyler, The Creator)

Earl Sweatshirt - Doris
 07. "Sasquatch" (featuring Tyler, The Creator)
 13. "Whoa" (featuring Tyler, The Creator)

2014

Schoolboy Q - Oxymoron
 08. "The Purge" (featuring Tyler, The Creator and Kurupt)

2015

Mike G - Award Tour II
 04. "Highlights"

Kali Uchis - Por Vida
 02. "Call Me"
 08. "Speed"

Tyler, The Creator - Cherry Bomb
 01. "Deathcamp" (featuring Cole Alexander) [produced with Mike Einziger]
 02. "Buffalo" (featuring Shane Powers)
 03. "Pilot" (featuring Syd Bennett)
 04. "Run" (featuring Chaz Bundick and Schoolboy Q)
 05. "Find Your Wings" (featuring Roy Ayers, Syd Bennett and Kali Uchis)
 06. "Cherry Bomb"
 07. "Blow My Load" (featuring Wanya Morris, Dâm-Funk, Austin Feinstein and Syd Bennett)
 08. "2Seater" (featuring Aaron Shaw, Samantha Nelson and Austin Feinstein) [produced with Mike Einziger]
 09. "The Brown Stains of Darkeese Latifah Part 6–12 (Remix)" (featuring Schoolboy Q)
 10. "Fucking Young / Perfect" (featuring Charlie Wilson, Chaz Bundick, Syd Bennett and Kali Uchis)
 11. "Smuckers" (featuring Kanye West and Lil Wayne)
 12. "Keep Da O's" (featuring Pharrell Williams and Coco O.)
 13. "Okaga, CA" (featuring Alice Smith, Leon Ware and Clem Creevy)

Bonus Track:
 14. "Yellow"

The Internet - Ego Death 
 12. "Palace / Curse" (featuring Tyler, The Creator and Steve Lacy) [produced with Steve Lacy]

Mac Miller - GO:OD AM 
 01. "Doors"

Casey Veggies - Live & Grow
 12. "RIP" (featuring Tyler, The Creator)

2016

Domo Genesis - Genesis 
 06. "Go (Gas)" (featuring Wiz Khalifa, Juicy J and Tyler, The Creator)

Schoolboy Q - Blank Face LP 
 11. "Big Body" (featuring Tha Dogg Pound)

Frank Ocean - Blonde 
 06. "Skyline To" (produced with Om'Mas Keith, Malay, and Frank Ocean)

2017

Matt Martians - The Drum Chord Theory 
 09. "Dent Jusay" (featuring Syd and Steve Lacy)
 10. "Callin' on Me" (produced with Matt Martians)

Tyler, The Creator - Flower Boy
 01. "Foreword" (featuring Rex Orange County)	
 02. "Where This Flower Blooms" (featuring Frank Ocean)	
 03. "Sometimes..."
 04. "See You Again" (featuring Kali Uchis)
 05. "Who Dat Boy" (featuring ASAP Rocky)
 06. "Pothole" (featuring Jaden Smith)	
 07. "Garden Shed" (featuring Estelle)
 08. "Boredom" (featuring Rex Orange County and Anna of the North)
 09. "I Ain't Got Time!"
 10. "911 / Mr. Lonely" (featuring Frank Ocean and Steve Lacy)
 11. "Droppin' Seeds" (featuring Lil Wayne)	
 12. "November"
 13. "Glitter"
 14. "Enjoy Right Now, Today"

2018

Tyler, The Creator - Okra
 "Okra"

Tyler, The Creator - 435
 "435"

Tyler, The Creator - Music Inspired by Illumination & Dr. Seuss' The Grinch
 01. "Whoville"
 02. "Lights On" (featuring Ryan Beatty and Santigold)
 03. "Hot Chocolate" (featuring Jerry Paper)
 04. "Big Bag"
 05. "When Gloves Come Off" (featuring Ryan Beatty)
 06. "Cindy Lou's Wish"

$ILKMONEY - I Hate My Life and I Really Wish People Would Stop Telling Me Not To

 01. "Casket"
 03. "My Forte"
 05. "NAGA" (featuring Tyler, the Creator)
 07. "Kitt-Katt" (featuring Tyler, the Creator)
 08. "Why Lie (10 Million Ways to Die)"

2019

Solange Knowles - When I Get Home
11. "My Skin My Logo"

Tyler, The Creator - Igor
 01. "IGOR'S THEME"
 02. "EARFQUAKE"
 03. "I THINK"
 04. "EXACTLY WHAT YOU RUN FROM YOU END UP CHASING" 
 05. "RUNNING OUT OF TIME"
 06. "NEW MAGIC WAND"
 07. "A BOY IS A GUN"
 08. "PUPPET"
 09. "WHAT'S GOOD"
 10. "GONE, GONE / THANK YOU"
 11. "I DON'T LOVE YOU ANYMORE"
 12 "ARE WE STILL FRIENDS?"
Bonus track:
 04. "BOYFRIEND"

Slow Hollows - Actors
 03. "Heart" (featuring Ryan Beatty) [produced with Austin Anderson and Daniel Fox]

2020

Westside Gunn - Pray for Paris
 12. "Party wit Pop Smoke" (featuring Keisha Plum)

La Roux
 "Automatic Driver (Tyler, The Creator Remix)"

2021

Tyler, the Creator - Call Me If You Get Lost
 1. "Sir Baudelaire" (featuring DJ Drama)
 2. "Corso"
 3. "Lemonhead" (featuring 42 Dugg)
 4. "WusYaName" (featuring YoungBoy Never Broke Again and Ty Dolla Sign)
 5. "Lumberjack"
 6. "Hot Wind Blows" (featuring Lil Wayne)
 7. "Massa"
 8. "RunItUp" (featuring Teezo Touchdown)
 9. "Manifesto" (featuring Domo Genesis)
 10. "Sweet / I Thought You Wanted to Dance" (featuring Brent Faiyaz and Fana Hues)
 11. "Momma Talk"
 12. "Rise!" (featuring Daisy World) [produced with Jamie xx]
 13. "Blessed"
 14. "Juggernaut" (featuring Lil Uzi Vert and Pharrell Williams)
 15. "Wilshire"
 16. "Safari" [produced with Jay Versace]
Bonus track:
 16. "Fishtail" [produced with Beat Butcha and Daringer]

Snoh Aalegra - "Temporary Highs in the Violet Skies"

 5. “NEON PEACH” (featuring Tyler, The Creator)
 10. “IN THE MOMENT” (featuring Tyler, The Creator)

Maxo Kream - Weight of the World
 4. "Big Persona" (featuring Tyler, The Creator)

2022

Rex Orange County - Who Cares
 2. "OPEN A WINDOW" (featuring Tyler, The Creator) [produced with Benny Sings and Rex Orange County]

SZA - Ctrl (Deluxe edition)
 21. "Jodie"

2023

ASAP Rocky

 Same Problems? [produced with Asap Rocky and Hector Delgado]

References

Discographies of American artists
Production discographies
Production discography